The following is a List of professorships at the University of Aberdeen.

College of Arts and Social Sciences
Aberdeen Asset Management Professor of Finance and Investment Management
Jaffrey Professor of Political Economy
MacRobert Professor of Land Economy
Schlumberger Professor of Petroleum Economics

University of Aberdeen Business School

School of Divinity, History and Philosophy
Regius Professor of Humanity
Regius Chair of Logic
Regius Chair of Moral Philosophy
King's Chair of Systematic Theology (1620)
Marischal Chair of Divinity (1616)
Established Chair of Hebrew and Semitic Languages (1637)
Burnett-Fletcher Chair of History
Chair in Practical Theology and Pastoral Care

School of Education

School of Language & Literature
Regius Chair of English Literature

School of Law
 Professor of Jurisprudence
 Professor of Scots Law
 Professor of Civil Law
 Professor of Public Law

Notable former holders of the above posts include Prof David Daube, Prof Peter Stein, Neil Kennedy, and Prof T B Smith

School of Social Science

College of Life Sciences and Medicine

School of Biological Sciences
Regius Chair of Botany

Schools of Medical Sciences and Medicine
Chair of Anaesthesia and Intensive Care
Regius Chair of Anatomy
Chair of Bone Metabolism
Chair of Child Health
Chair of Environmental and Occupational Medicine
Chair of Epidemiology
Chair of Gastroenterology
James Mackenzie Chair of General Practice
Chair of Genetics
Chair of Haematology
Chair of Immunology
Chair of Medical Education
Chair of Medical Genetics
Chair of Medical Mycology
Chair of Medical Statistics
Regius Chair of Medicine
Chair of Medicine (Care of the Elderly)
Chair of Medicine and Therapeutics
Chair of Mental Health
Chair of Microbiology
Chair of Molecular and Cell Biology
Chair of Molecular Toxicology
Regius Chair of Obstetrics and Gynaecology (previously Regius Chair of Midwifery)
Chair of Ophthalmology
Sir Harry Platt Chair of Orthopaedic Surgery
Chair of Paediatric Surgery
Regius Chair of Pathology
Regius Chair of Physiology
Chair of Physiology & Pharmacology Education
NHS Grampian Chair of Primary Care
Chair of Public Health
GHB Chair of Public Health Medicine
Roland Sutton Chair of Radiology
Chair of Reproductive Medicine
Chair of Rheumatology
Chair of Rural Health
Regius Chair of Surgery
Chair of Surgical Oncology

School of Psychology

College of Physical Sciences

School of Engineering and Physical Sciences
Regius Chair of Natural History

School of Geosciences

This list is incomplete